The Battle of Pullalur was a battle fought between the Chalukya king Pulakesin II and the Pallava king Mahendravarman I in the town of Pullalur or Pollilur in about 618–19.

Causes 

The rapid expansion of the Chalukya Empire had resulted in the Chalukya annexation of the Vishnukundin kingdom. The Vishnukundins were allies of the Pallavas of Kanchi who were emerging as a major power in the 6th century AD. This embittered the Pallavas against them and a large number of battles were fought.

Events 

In about 617–18, Pulakesin II invaded and annexed Vengi. After his success against Vengi, he proceeded southwards and confining the Pallavas to the area around Kanchi. The Pallava king Mahendravarman I met Pulakesin at the town of Pullalur or Pollilur, about nine miles north of Kanchi. In the ensuing battle, Mahendravarman is believed to have given Pulikesin II a devastating defeat.

The Aihole inscription of Pulakesin II gives a detailed description of the battle

But Historians contradicts this inscription as not so true as Pallavas are ascending in power and had advanced military than Chalukyas

The Kasakudi plates state:

While Mahendravarman's enemies are not mentioned by name, some historians interpret this edit as a description of Pallava victory over the Chalukyas. However, many feel that a Pallava victory might have been most probable as there are evidences of the Chalukya army's incursions as far south and rapidly retreating after the battle.

Aftermath 

Following this, Pulakesin attacked Kanchi but unable to penetrate the defences of the Pallava capital, he proceeded southwards and tried to ravage the northern and central parts of Tamil Nadu intruding as far as the Kaveri River. Then, after Pallavas and Cholas opposition, unable to accept his submission, Pulakesin II returned to Vatapi.

References

Bibliography 

 
 

Pullalur
7th century in India
Chalukya dynasty
Tamil history
Pallava dynasty